"Let's Ride" is the first single from Richie Rich's album Seasoned Veteran, released in 1996. The song peaked at #8 on the Billboard Hot Rap Singles chart, #67 on the Billboard Hot 100 chart, and #55 on the Hot R&B/Hip-Hop Singles & Tracks chart.

On July 25, 2021, the song was featured in Episode 6 of the television series Blindspotting.

Music video

The official music video for the song was directed by Michael Lucero.

Track listing
"Let's Ride"
"Let's Ride (Rated R Version)"
"Funk"
"Let's Ride (Instrumental)"

References

1996 singles
Def Jam Recordings singles
Music videos directed by Michael Lucero
Richie Rich (rapper) songs
Gangsta rap songs